The Tijdschrift voor economische en sociale geografie (English: Journal of Economic & Social Geography) is a peer-reviewed academic journal published by Wiley-Blackwell on behalf of the Royal Dutch Geographical Society. The editor-in-chief is Frank van Oort (Erasmus University Rotterdam). The journal focuses on contemporary issues in human geography, with articles relating to economic, social, cultural and political geographical themes. It journal was established in 1910, making it the oldest journal in human geography.

According to the Journal Citation Reports, the journal has a 2017 impact factor of 0.653.

References

External links
 

Wiley-Blackwell academic journals
English-language journals
Publications established in 1910
Geography journals
Economics journals
5 times per year journals